The second Lord Melbourne ministry was formed in the United Kingdom of Great Britain and Ireland by the Viscount Melbourne in 1835.

History
Lord Melbourne's second government came to power after Sir Robert Peel's minority government resigned in 1835. Lord Palmerston returned as Foreign Secretary while Lord John Russell held his first major office as Home Secretary.

In 1837 Queen Victoria succeeded to the throne, and as was usual for a queen regnant, the Royal Household was appointed by the Prime Minister. The young Queen was so attached to her Whig ladies of the bedchamber that after Melbourne's resignation in 1839, she refused to let Sir Robert Peel replace them with Conservative ladies. This was known as the Bedchamber Crisis, and led to Peel's refusal to form a government. Melbourne therefore resumed, and continued in office until the Conservatives finally won a House of Commons majority in the General Election of 1841. He was succeeded by Sir Robert Peel's second government.

1841 votes of no confidence

The 1841 votes of no confidence against the government of Viscount Melbourne were votes of no confidence in the government of William Lamb, 2nd Viscount Melbourne which occurred on 7 June 1841. Melbourne lost the vote by only one vote and dissolved Parliament leading to an election in July 1841. Melbourne lost a second vote of confidence shortly after the election in August, leading to his resignation.

Cabinets

April 1835 – August 1839

Notes
Viscount Duncannon served concurrently as Lord Privy Seal and First Commissioner of Woods and Forests.

August 1839 – September 1841

Notes
Viscount Duncannon served concurrently as Lord Privy Seal and First Commissioner of Woods and Forests between August 1839 and January 1840.
Lord Clarendon served concurrently as Lord Privy Seal and Chancellor of the Duchy of Lancaster between October 1840 and June 1841.

List of ministers
Members of the Cabinet are indicated by bold face.

Notes

References

C. Cook and B. Keith, British Historical Facts 1830–1900

British ministries
Government
1835 establishments in the United Kingdom
1841 disestablishments in the United Kingdom
1830s in the United Kingdom
1840s in the United Kingdom
Ministries of William IV of the United Kingdom
Ministries of Queen Victoria
Cabinets established in 1835
Cabinets disestablished in 1841

pl:Trzeci rząd lorda Melbourne